Housing at Virginia Commonwealth University is managed by VCU Residential Life & Housing. The university currently houses 6,300 residents in twelve residence halls across two campuses.  

Some halls are available only to freshmen, while others are available only to upperclass students. Eighty percent of first-year students live on campus. Rhoads Hall, Johnson Hall, the Honors College, Brandt Hall, GRC III, and the Gladding Residential Complex are the primary freshmen communities on campus. Together they house over 3300 students.

Monroe Park Campus

Rhoads Hall
Structure: 18-story high-rise
Restriction: Freshmen
Capacity: 697
Style: Double, triple rooms; corridor-style floors
9-month lease, based on academic calendar

Johnson Hall
Structure: 12-story high-rise
Restriction: Freshmen
Capacity: 527
Style: Double, triple rooms, corridor-style floors
9-month lease, based on academic calendar
Johnson Hall is the oldest residence hall at Virginia Commonwealth University. Built in 1915, it was originally a high priced apartment building. Each of its upper floors contained four large apartments. VCU bought Johnson Hall in the 1950s and renovated the building into a residence hall while the school was still called Richmond Professional Institute. After a 2011 renovation to the first floor, the only evidence of the original interior is an early 1900s-era gold Letterbox.

Brandt Hall

Structure: 17-story high-rise
Restriction: Freshmen
Capacity: 624
Style: 4-8 people per suite in double rooms
9-month residency, based on academic calendar

Gladding Residential Center
Structure: 12-story Highrise
Restriction: Freshman
Capacity: 1500+
Style: Mixed corridor style doubles with shared bathrooms and 4 person semi-suites (two doubles that share a bathroom)
9-month lease, based on the academic calendar (open over breaks)

Gladding Residence Center was originally built in 1984 as two 3-story buildings, one apartment-style and one traditional. It was named after Jane Bell Gladding, a professor at the school from 1947 to 1973. In 2016, plans were constructed to demolish and rebuild GRC I & II into two brand new buildings, also apartment-style and one traditional, but was merged into one building.

GRC III
Structure: 5-story
Restriction: Freshmen
Capacity: 172
Style: 2 and 4 person suites 
9-month lease, based on the academic calendar (open over breaks)
Built in 2003, GRC III was an addition to the two other Gladding Residence Center buildings built in 1984. When the main GRC buildings were demolished, it was decided to keep GRC III as it wasn't as old as the others. It is called GRC III because the old GRC was split into I and II, but plans were changed last minute for the new reconstruction to be built as one building.

Ackell Residence Center
Structure: 4-story
Restriction: Upperclassmen
Capacity: 394
Style: 2-4 person apartments, with single rooms
9-month lease

Broad and Belvidere
Structure: 4-story
Restriction: Upperclassmen
Capacity: 480
Style: 2-4 person apartments with single rooms (the Gilmer addition was opened in 2012 and has 1-3 person apartments with single rooms)
12-month lease

Cary and Belvidere
Structure: 5-story
Restriction: Sophomores
Capacity: 413
Style: 2-4 person apartments in single rooms
9-month lease, based on academic year (open over breaks)

The Honors College
Structure: 7-story
Restriction: Honors College
Capacity: 177
Style: Single rooms, each with a private bath and corridor-style halls
9-month lease, based on academic calendar.

West Grace South
Structure: 5-story
Restriction: Upperclassmen
Capacity: 459
Style: 4 person apartments with single and double rooms 
12-month lease
Opened in 2012, West Grace South houses the ASPiRE and Lavender House living/learning programs.

West Grace North
Structure: 5-story
Restriction: Upperclassmen
Capacity: 388 
Style: 4 person apartments with single and double rooms
12-month lease
Opened in 2013, West Grace North houses the GLOBE living/learning program.

Grace & Broad Residence Center
Structure: complex of two 5-story halls
Restriction: Upperclassmen
Capacity: 407
Style: 4 person apartments with single bedrooms
12-month lease
Opened in 2015, Grace & Broad is home to the VCU LEAD and VCU INNOVATE living/learning programs.

MCV Campus

Cabaniss Hall
Structure: 10-story
Restriction: None
Capacity: 423
Style: Single and double rooms, corridor style
9-month contract, according to academic year
Cabaniss Hall, located near downtown Richmond on the MCV campus, is a 10-story high rise building. Most students in Cabaniss hall take classes on the Monroe Park campus, and either drive or take a GRTC bus or VCU Ram Ride the 1.5 miles to classes and other activities.

Off Campus
Many upperclassmen live in apartments in the surrounding neighborhoods to VCU. The neighborhoods include the Fan district, Carver, Oregon Hill, Monroe Ward, Jackson Ward, Shockoe Bottom and Church Hill.

Private Student Housing Complexes
To meet the demands of student housing, numerous private apartment complexes have been built on or next to campus.
8 1/2 Canal Street – 540 students
1200 West Marshall – 406 students
The Collegiate – 690 students
Pine Court Apartments
Shafer-Grace High-rise – 156 units (August 2014)

References

External links
 
 

Virginia Commonwealth University
University and college dormitories in the United States
Virginia Commonwealth University housing